David Stewart (born 14 August 1978) is a Scottish former footballer who played for Ayr United, Dumbarton, Clydebank, Forfar Athletic and Queen's Park.

References

1978 births
Scottish footballers
Dumbarton F.C. players
Clydebank F.C. (1965) players
Forfar Athletic F.C. players
Ayr United F.C. players
Queen's Park F.C. players
Scottish Football League players
Living people
Association football defenders